Grégory Anquetil (born 1970) is a former French team handball player. He competed at the 1996 Summer Olympics, where the French team placed 4th, and also at the 2000 and 2004 Summer Olympics. After his retirement from the sport, he provides commentary for handball matches for Canal plus.

References

1970 births
Living people
French male handball players
Olympic handball players of France
Handball players at the 1996 Summer Olympics
Handball players at the 2000 Summer Olympics
Handball players at the 2004 Summer Olympics